In 2023, some rugby union national teams will play matches in preparation for the 2023 Rugby World Cup, which act as a stand-in for the usual mid-year international tests.

Matches

July

5 August

12 August

19 August

25/26 August

See also
 2023 World Rugby Pacific Nations Cup
 2023 Rugby Championship

References

2023
Warm-up Matches